Amina Andrew Clement (born 3 March 1963) is a Tanzanian CCM politician and Member of Parliament for Koani constituency since 2005.

References

1963 births
Living people
Tanzanian Muslims
Chama Cha Mapinduzi MPs
Tanzanian MPs 2010–2015
Tumekuja Secondary School alumni